Charles L. Vignoles (date of birth not known — 26 July 1976) was an Anglo-Argentine first-class cricketer.

Vignoles played first-class cricket for Argentina in January 1938, making two appearances against Sir T. E. W. Brinckman's XI. Playing as a middle order batsman, he scored 75 runs in his two matches, with a highest score of 45; this score came in his first match at the Hurlingham Club. Vignoles died at La Cumbre in Córdoba Province in July 1976.

References

External links

Date of birth unknown
1976 deaths
Argentine people of English descent
Argentine cricketers